Time in the Republic of Artsakh, a breakaway state internationally recognised as part of Azerbaijan, is given by Armenia Time (AMT; UTC+04:00). Artsakh does not have an associated daylight saving time.

As Artsakh is not an internationally recognised sovereign state, it is not granted a zone.tab entry on the IANA time zone database.

See also 
Time in Europe
Time in Abkhazia
Time in Transnistria
List of time zones by country
List of time zones by UTC offset

References

External links 
Current time in Artsakh at Time.is